Perumanna-Klari, also known as Perumanna, is a census town and a Gram panchayat in Tirur Taluk, Malappuram district, Kerala, India.

Local administration 
The region is administered by the Perumanna-Klari Grama Panchayat. It is composed of 16 wards:

References

External links

Cities and towns in Malappuram district
Parappanangadi area